Donald Bruneski (born 10 March 1937) is a Canadian former alpine skier who competed in the 1960 Winter Olympics.

References

1937 births
Living people
Canadian male alpine skiers
Olympic alpine skiers of Canada
Alpine skiers at the 1960 Winter Olympics
Sportspeople from Trail, British Columbia